The Census (Ireland) Act 1900 was an Act of Parliament of the Parliament of the United Kingdom, given royal assent on 9 April 1900.

The Act laid down the methods for taking the 1901 United Kingdom census in Ireland. The legislative basis for the census to take place in England, Scotland and Wales was provided by the Census (Great Britain) Act 1900. The Act pertaining to Ireland was repealed in the Republic of Ireland by the Oireachtas passing the Statute Law Revision Act 1983. In the United Kingdom, it was repealed in part by the Statute Law Revision Act 1908, with the residue repealed by the Statute Law Revision Act 1950.

References

United Kingdom Acts of Parliament 1900
Repealed United Kingdom Acts of Parliament
Censuses in the United Kingdom
Acts of the Parliament of the United Kingdom concerning Ireland
1900 in Ireland